Solomon Richards may refer to:
 Solomon Richards (soldier)
 Solomon Richards (surgeon)